Kaos: The Anti-Acoustic Warfare is the second studio album by English musician Adam F. It was released on 10 September 2001 through EMI. The album moves away from the drum and bass music from Colours (which Adam F described as "a phase"), and instead features hip hop music with almost every song featuring a vocalist. Upon release, the album reached number 44 on the UK Albums Chart.

Background
The album was promoted by its singles which landed on the UK Singles Chart. "Smash Sumthin" (featuring Redman) peaking at 11, Adam F's highest-charting single to date, "Stand Clear" (featuring M.O.P.) in 2001 peaking at 43, "Where's My..." (featuring Lil' Mo) in 2002 peaking at 50, and "Dirty Harry's Revenge" (featuring Beenie Man) also peaking at number 50.

Track listing

Charts

References

2001 albums
Hip hop albums by English artists